Rucellai Chapel or Cappella Rucellai may refer to:

 The Rucellai Chapel in the Basilica of Santa Maria Novella, in Florence, Italy
 The Rucellai Chapel in the church of San Pancrazio, Florence, Italy
 The Rucellai Chapel in the Pieve di Santo Stefano, in Campi Bisenzio, in the province of Florence, Italy
 The "Rucellai o Dei Beati" Chapel of the church of Sant'Andrea della Valle, in Rome, Italy